Arvier (Valdôtain:  or); is a town and comune in the Aosta Valley region of northwestern Italy.

Geography

Wine
The local wine, Enfer d'Arvier, had its own DOC designation before being subsumed into the Valle d'Aosta DOC. It is a blend made primarily from the Petit Rouge grape with lesser amounts of Dolcetto, Gamay, Neyret, Pinot noir, and/or Vien de Nus.

People
Arvier was the birthplace of Maurice Garin, the winner of the original Tour de France in 1903. His family migrated to Northern France in 1885.

Notes and references 

Cities and towns in Aosta Valley